Sidney Sardus Warner (April 17, 1829 – July 6, 1908) was a Republican politician in the state of Ohio and was Ohio State Treasurer from 1866–1871.

S S Warner was born April 17, 1829 at Suffield, Connecticut, moved with his family to Mantua Portage County, Ohio in 1832, and Lorain County, Ohio in 1839. He was elected to the Ohio House of Representatives in 1861 and 1863 to the 55th and 56th General Assemblies.

Warner was elected in 1865, 1867, and 1869 as Ohio State Treasurer. He later was a candidate for nomination for governor and representative to Congress, and a banker and manufacturer in Wellington, Ohio. Presidential elector for Garfiled/Arthur in 1880. He died July 6, 1908 in Wellington, and was buried in Greenwood Cemetery, Wellington, Ohio.

In 1851 Warner married Margaret A. Bradner of Lorain County. The couple had four children.

Notes

References

State treasurers of Ohio
People from Wellington, Ohio
1829 births
Republican Party members of the Ohio House of Representatives
1908 deaths
1880 United States presidential electors
People from Suffield, Connecticut
People from Mantua, Ohio